Cheesebrough may refer to:

Albert Cheesebrough (1935–2020), English footballer

See also
 Cheeseborough (disambiguation)
 Cheseborough (disambiguation)
 Chesebrough (disambiguation)
 Chesebro